Qichun County is a county of eastern Hubei province, People's Republic of China. It is under the administration of Huanggang City.

Qichun County has been a major historical center of traditional Chinese medicine. It is known in China as the "Professor County", due to the high amount of professors and other academic experts hailing from the county.

Toponymy 
Qichun County is named after the abundant qicai, a variety of Chinese mallow, in the area.

History

The area of present-day Qichun County has been inhabited since the Neolithic age.

In 224 BCE, Qin forces pursued the retreating Chu forces to Qinan (蕲南; northwest of present-day Qichun in Hubei) and Xiang Yan was either killed in the action or committed suicide following his defeat.

Qichun County was first organized during the Western Han, possibly as early as 201 BCE. Due to its strategic location, in history Qichun was referred to as “The Key Point of Jingchu” (Jingchu is another name of the ancient state of Chu).

Three Kingdoms period 
During the Three Kingdoms period, Qichun was made a commandery. In the summer of 223 CE, Eastern Wu general He Qi attacked and eliminated an outpost of Cao Wei in the new commandery territory of Qichun, on the southern slopes of the Dabie Shan mountains. But for the next twelve months the northern front remained quiet. The Grand Administrator of Qichun was Jin Zong, a former officer of Sun Quan who had deserted and joined Cao Wei. It appears he was given the commandery appointment at this time, in the hill country of the Dabie Shan on the border region between Lujiang and Jiangxia, so that he could disturb the communications routes along the Yangtze and across that river to the south.

There is evidence that the Qichun commandery had been established a few years earlier, evidently on the basis of the county of that name in Jiangxia Commandery of Later Han, but the territory had been abandoned by Cao Cao at the time of his withdrawal in 213 CE. From this time, after the defeat of Jin Zong's infiltration, the territory was held by Wu. One of the subordinate commanders in He Qi's attack on Qichun was Mi Fang, the erstwhile officer of Guan Yu who had surrendered Jiangling to Lü Meng in 219 AD. Qichun also was evidently a proving ground for renegades.

Later history 
During the Tang dynasty, the area was reorganized as a fu. Qichun would later be reverted back to a county.

During the Song dynasty, Qichun County was home to an extraordinarily large market for traditional Chinese medicine, which poet Lu You described as 40 li long.

Prince Jing's Mansion was constructed in Qichun County during the Ming dynasty.

People's Republic of China 
In 1949, Qichun County was placed under Huanggang Prefecture. In 1995, Huanggang was changed from a prefecture to a prefecture-level city.

Geography

Qichun County is located in the east of Hubei, along the northern banks of the Yangtze, and at the southern foot of the Dabie Mountains. To its east is the province of Anhui.

Of this,  are arable. Forested areas cover .

(Note: While not stated in government data, unless there is a statistical error, the remaining  must be hills/mountains, in the northern part of the County, or simply unusable land).

Qichun County's area is topographically diverse, with mountains, hills, and plains. The elevation decreases gradually from mountains of northeast to the lowlands of southwest. The  is located within the county.

Climate
The local climate is classed as "subtropical mainland monsoon," with distinct seasons and abundant rainfall (average 134 centimeters per year). When the Yangtze River floods, Qichun County also experiences some flooding.

Administrative divisions 

Qichun County administers the following 13 towns, 1 township, and 5 other township-level divisions:

Government 

The government buildings for the County and the Town are adjacent to each other.

Demographics
As of 2018, Qichun County has a population of about 1,011,100, residing in 321,400 households, giving the county an average household size of 3.15.

A 2012 estimate approximated Qichun County's population at 1,030,000.

The 2010 Chinese Census put Qichun County's population at 727,805.

A 2004 estimate approximated Qichun County's population at 951,391.

The 2000 Chinese Census put Qichun County's population at 949,479.

A 1996 estimate put Qichun County's population at about 921,000.

Qichun Town's population was 162,000, of whom 71,000 were engaged in agriculture (fisheries, crops, and herbs are the main agricultural sectors) and the remainder non-agriculture (which includes minerals and manufacturing of various kinds). About 40% of all the farmers of Qichun County are engaged in growing herbs.

Culture
Qichun County is the birthplace of famous herbalist Li Shizhen, who was born and lived in Qizhou town, and has been a major historical center of traditional Chinese medicine for hundreds of years.

Qichun County is often nicknamed "Professor County" due to the high amount of professors and other academic experts hailing from the county.

Transportation

Qichun is reasonably well-served by rail, bus, and road transportation; there is no airport.

The Beijing–Kowloon railway runs through Qichun County. The main Beijing to Guangzhou rail line passes through Qichun, and there are local trains, west to the Hubei provincial capital of Wuhan and south-east into Jiangxi province.

There is a local bus service and also frequent express buses into Wuhan via the new inter-provincial expressway running east–west across the province. A journey by express bus to Wuhan takes less than three hours; by car the journey is less than 2.5 hours.

Major expressways in Qichun County include the Huangshi-Huanggang portion of the G70 Fuzhou–Yinchuan Expressway, which runs through the southwest of Qichun County. the G42 Shanghai–Chengdu Expressway, and the G50 Shanghai–Chongqing Expressway. National Highway 318 also runs through Qichun County. The , the Qi-Cao Highway, and the Qi-Tai Highway all run through Qichun County. Other major roads include the Huang-Biao Highway, and the Dabie Mountains Red Tourism Highway. Numerous future expressways are planned.

Economy

Mineral resources in Qichun County include gold, copper, manganese, lead, iron, quartz, serpentine, dolomite, marble, and black jade.

Qichun County has long played an outsized role in traditional Chinese medicine, and was historically home to large markets for medicinal ingredients. Medicinal markets remain central to Qichun County, which hosts the Hubei Lishizhen Traditional Chinese Medicine Professional Market. The majority of the entries in the Bencao Gangmu, an encyclopedia of traditional Chinese medicine ingredients, can be found in Qichun County. According to the county government, there is more than 200,000 mu of cropland devoted to growing medicinal ingredients.

The herbal industry, centered on Qizhou, is the biggest component of the Qichun County economy. Some 200,000 herb farmers live in Qichun County. They produce more than 700 varieties. The local herb wholesale market is the third largest in China, with more than 800 million yuan (US$100 million, as of 2006) of annual trading volume.

There is only one hotel of any significance in Qichun. But it is a new hotel, built around 2001.

Social welfare

Qichun County has its own Social Welfare Institute (SWI) to accommodate elderly people, handicapped persons, the homeless, and orphans. The Social Welfare Institute constructed a new building in 2004, designed mainly for the elderly and handicapped children and adults. Children which are abandoned or orphaned, and are awaiting adoption either domestically or internationally, are placed with local foster families. But they visit the SWI weekly for medical checks and group playtime activities. About 400 orphans have been adopted internationally from Qichun County SWI. These children now live with families all over the world: in Canada and the U.S.A., in Australasia, and in most countries of Western Europe.

Notable people 
Qichun County was a historical center for education and traditional Chinese medicine, as well as an economic and cultural center within eastern Hubei. The county has produced many important historical figures in this field, including herbalist Li Shizhen. Other notable figures from Qichun County during dynastic China include the following:

 Gu Jingxing (1621–1687), a prolific author of hundreds of books, and an Imperial scholar from a long hereditary line of scholars going back several generations of the Gu family.
 , a Song dynasty writer.
 , a famous warrior from the Ming dynasty.

More-recent famous people from Qichun include:
Wu Shu (writer and Communist revolutionary, 1902–1985);
Hu Feng (literary theorist, 1902–1985);
Huang Kan (Professor, newspaper founder, 1886–1935);
Zhan Dabei (KMT leftist, 1887–1927);
 (1879–1930, author and Minister of Internal Affairs in the revolutionary government of Sun Yatsen);
Dong Yuhua (leader of student movement and military commander, 1907–1939);
Yuan Shu (government Minister, started Chinese Communist Party intelligence system, 1911–1987);
Gao Huiyuan (born 1922) medical scientist and doctor to Premier Zhou Enlai;
Yu Xiaozhong (born 1965) poet.

References

External links

"Hubei Sheng: Qichun Xian difang zhibian zuan wei yuan hui bian zuan." ("History of Qichun County in Hubei Province" in Chinese), published at Wuhan, by "Hubei kexue jishu chuban she" in 1997. (ISBN C47267C56)
Huanggang Government website (bilingual, Chinese-English)

Huanggang
Counties of Hubei